Philippe Charles François, 3rd Duke of Arenberg  (10 May 1663—25 August 1691) was also the 9th Duke of Aarschot.

He became a knight of the Order of the Golden Fleece in 1685. Like his father, Charles Eugene, 2nd Duke of Arenberg, he was Grand-Bailiff and Captain-General of Hainaut. The youngest general in the imperial army at the Battle of Slankamen (in modern-day Vojvodina, Serbia), he died from his wounds on 19 August 1691.

He married Maria Enrichetta del Carretto, Marchesa de Grana e Savona in Italy, in 1684. He was succeeded by their son, Leopold Philippe d'Arenberg, as the 4th Duke of Arenberg, whose descendants include the current line of the Prince-Dukes d'Arenberg, as well as Empress Elisabeth of Austria and Albert I, King of the Belgians.

His daughter Marie Anne (1689-1736) married François Egon de La Tour, Count d'Auvergne and Margrave of Berg-op-Zoom, a French prince étranger and nephew of the Marshal of France Turenne. Marie Anne's daughter Marie Henriette de La Tour d'Auvergne, Margravine of Berg-op-Zoom married John Christian, Count Palatine of Sulzbach, and was the mother of Charles Theodore, Elector of Bavaria.

See also
List of Knights of the Golden Fleece

Notes

Further reading
http://www.arenbergfoundation.eu The Arenberg archives, a family with very strong Flemish roots, quite important in Imperial Spain and later in the Holy Roman Empire, are located for the most part in Arras, Brussels, Cambrai, Coblenz, Douai, Düsseldorf, Enghien, Louvain, Osnabrück, Paris, Salzburg and Vienna.

House of Ligne
Arenberg family
Dukes of Arenberg
Dukes of Aarschot
1663 births
1691 deaths